Interleukin 35 (IL-35) is a recently discovered anti-inflammatory cytokine from the IL-12 family. Member of IL-12 family - IL-35 is produced by wide range of regulatory lymphocytes and plays a role in immune suppression. IL-35 can block the development of Th1 and Th17 cells by limiting early T cell proliferation.

Structure

IL-35 and its receptor 
IL-35 is a dimeric protein composed of IL-12α and IL-27β chains, which are encoded by two separate genes called IL12A and EBI3 (Epstein-Barr virus-induced gene 3), respectively. IL-35 receptor consists of IL-12Rβ2 (part of the IL-12R) and gp130 (part of IL-27R) chains. Compared to these two related interleukins, IL-35 is also able to signal through only one of the aforementioned chains. This was proven in vivo when absence of either of the receptor chains did not influence effects of IL-35. On regulatory B-cells, IL-35 signals through the IL-12Rβ2 and IL-27Rα subunits.

EBI3 is a homologue to IL-12 p40 and to the ciliary neurotrophic factor receptor, whose expression is induced in B lymphoblastoid cells by EBV infection

Function

Expression 
Secreted by regulatory T-cells (Tregs), regulatory B-cells (Bregs) or even CD8+ regulatory T cells, IL-35 suppresses inflammatory responses of immune cells. IL-35 is not constitutively expressed in tissues, but the gene encoding IL-35 is transcribed by vascular endothelial cells, smooth muscle cells and monocytes after activation with proinflammatory stimuli. IL-35 has selective activities on different T-cell subsets; it induces proliferation of Treg cell populations but reduces activity of Th17 cell populations.

Role in disease

Autoimmune conditions 
Studies in mice show the absence of either IL-35 chain from regulatory Tregs reduces the cells' ability to suppress inflammation. This has been observed during cell culture experiments and using an experimental model for inflammatory bowel disease. A group of scientists established a CIA (collagen-induced arthritis) mouse model to show suppressive effects of IL-35. Intraperitoneal injection of IL-35 in the tested subjects lowered expression of several factors linked to this disease (such as VEGF and its receptors, TNF-α). The effect of IL-35 in this case seems to be the inhibition of STAT1 signalling pathway. Another experiment performed on a mouse model of EAE has shown, that mice lacking IL-35-producing B cells are unable to recover from the T-cell mediated demyelination but are resistant to infection by pathogenic intracellular microbe Salmonella typhimurium. In T1D (type 1 diabetes), plasma level of IL-35 is lower than healthy individuals. IL-35 production by Tregs is decreased in mouse models of T1D, and administration of IL-35 prevents the development of experimental T1D and reverses established experimental T1D. In T1D patients with remaining C-peptide, IL-35 production by Tregs and Bregs is much higher than T1D patients with no remaining C-peptide.

Infectious diseases 
It has been shown that IL-35 increases replication of HBV virus both in vitro and in transgenic mice by targeting its transcription factor HNF4α.

Tumor

Given its suppressive function, IL-35 is also involved in tumor progression and tumor immune surveillance. Elevated circulating IL-35 levels have been found in several human tumors such as acute myeloid leukemia, pancreatic ductal adenocarcinoma and colorectal cancer.

Moreover, Forkhead box protein 3 (Foxp3) as a transcription factor is an essential molecular marker of regulatory T (Treg) cells. Foxp3 polymorphism (rs3761548) might be involved in cancer progression like gastric cancer through influencing Tregs function and the secretion of immunomodulatory cytokines such as IL-10, IL-35, and TGF-β.

References 

Interleukins